Detroj railway station is a railway station in Ahmedabad district, Gujarat, India on the Western line of the Western railway network. Passenger trains halt here.

Detroj has a car-stacking facility that serves a nearby Maruti Suzuki India factory.

References 

Railway stations in Ahmedabad
Ahmedabad railway division